Mirgah may refer to:
 Mirgah-e Derizh
 Mirgah Naqshineh